Valdiviomyia nigra is a species of Hoverfly in the family Syrphidae.

Distribution
Chile.

References

Eristalinae
Insects described in 1927
Diptera of South America
Taxa named by Raymond Corbett Shannon
Endemic fauna of Chile